, derived from the Ainu sar (marsh) and pet (river), is a coastal plain and low-lying moor in northwestern Hokkaidō, Japan.

See also
Rishiri-Rebun-Sarobetsu National Park
Ramsar sites in Japan

References

Ramsar sites in Japan
Landforms of Hokkaido
Plains of Japan